Bauhinia rufescens is a shrub in the family Fabaceae, native to sem-arid areas of Africa such as the Sahel.

It is usually 1–3 meters high but can grow to 8 meters. It appears to have thorns which are actually leafless shoots. Leaves are a deep shade of green. Seeds in bunches of dark brown pods.

It is common in the wild and also used as an ornamental.

References

External links
Bauhinia rufescens Lam. Fabaceae – Caesalpinioideae (World Agroforestry Centre

rufescens
Flora of Africa